Taira cangshan is a species of spider in the family Amaurobiidae. It was first described in 2008 by Zhang, Zhu and Da-xiang Song. It is native to China.

References

Amaurobiidae